109 Virginis is a single, white-hued star in the zodiac constellation of Virgo, located some 134.5 light years away from the Sun. It is the seventh-brightest member of this constellation, having an apparent visual magnitude of +3.72.

This is an A-type main-sequence star with a stellar classification of A0 V, and is a suspected chemically peculiar star. However, Abt and Morrell (1995) gave it a class of A0 IIInn, matching a giant star with "nebulous" lines. It is spinning rapidly with a projected rotational velocity of 285 km/s, which is giving the star an oblate shape with an equatorial bulge that is an estimated 31% larger than the polar radius. The star is 320 million years old with 2.58 times the mass of the Sun and about 2.7 times the Sun's radius. It is radiating 63 times the Sun's luminosity from its photosphere at an effective temperature of 9,683 K.

References 

A-type main-sequence stars
Virgo (constellation)
Durchmusterung objects
Virginis, 109
130109
072220
5511